Corné Fourie (born 2 September 1988) is a South African rugby union player. He can play as a loosehead prop or hooker.

He joined the  Currie Cup team for the 2016 season.

On 9 September 2019, it was confirmed that Fourie would join Premiership Rugby side Gloucester for the 2019–20 season. He left on 9 April 2021.

External links

itsrugby.co.uk profile

References

Living people
1988 births
South African rugby union players
Rugby union props
Afrikaner people
Pumas (Currie Cup) players
Blue Bulls players
People from Roodepoort
Lions (United Rugby Championship) players
South Africa Under-20 international rugby union players
Rugby union players from Gauteng
Golden Lions players
Saitama Wild Knights players
Stormers players
Western Province (rugby union) players
Gloucester Rugby players